Karthik Govindswamy (born 3 November 1993) is an Indian professional footballer who plays as a midfielder for I-League 2nd Division side ARA.

Club career
Born in Karnataka, Govindswamy began his career in the youth squad of I-League side Pune. After failing to make a professional appearance for the club, Govindswamy left Pune in 2013 to join CFA Senior Division League side Hindustan Eagles. Govindswamy would eventually join another local Chennai based side, Viva Chennai, before signing with Ozone in Bangalore in 2016. While with Ozone, Govindswamy participated in both the local Bangalore Super Division and I-League 2nd Division. He was also selected to be part of the Karnataka side which participated in the Santosh Trophy.

After spending some time with Ozone, Govindswamy signed with I-League side Churchill Brothers. He made his professional debut for the club on 2 December 2017 against Shillong Lajong. He started and played 55 minutes as Churchill Brothers were defeated 2–0. He stayed with the club for one season before joining Chennai City for the 2018–19 season. He made his debut for the club on 26 October 2018 against Indian Arrows, coming on as a 90th minute substitute as Chennai City won 4–1. He ended the season having played six matches for Chennai City as the club won the I-League title.

The next season, in January 2020, Govindswamy signed with I-League 2nd Division club ARA. He made his debut for the club on 25 January 2020 against Mumbai City Reserves. He started and played the whole match as ARA won 5–0.

Career statistics

Club

Honours
Chennai City
I-League: 2018–19

References

External links
Profile at the All India Football Federation website

1993 births
Living people
People from Karnataka
Indian footballers
Association football midfielders
Pune FC players
Ozone FC players
Churchill Brothers FC Goa players
Chennai City FC players
ARA FC players
Bangalore Super Division players
I-League 2nd Division players
I-League players
Karnataka footballers
Santosh Trophy players
Footballers from Karnataka